Montague Charles Glover (5 May 1898 – 1983) was a British freelance architect and private photographer. He is most notable for his depiction of homosexual life in London during the early to mid-20th century through private photographs taken primarily for his own enjoyment. His photographs tend to document 'rough trade', the working class and members of the military.

Life

Early years
Born in Leamington Spa, he had four sisters, the youngest of whom was 10 years his senior. He joined the Army in the Artists Rifles Regiment in 1916 and was promoted to Second Lieutenant in the Territorial Force in 1917. He was awarded the Military Cross for Bravery in 1918.

Later life and death
Glover is notable for his depictions of his partnership with his lover, Ralph Edward Hall (5 December 1913 – 1987), a rare documented example of a gay long-term relationship prior to the legalization of homosexuality in Britain in the 1960s. Ralph Edward Hall was born 5 December 1913 in Bermondsey in the East End of London. The two met around 1930 and Glover employed him as his manservant, perhaps to provide a social alibi for two men living together. The relationship lasted for more than 50 years, surviving the Second World War during which Hall was drafted to the Royal Air Force.

Much of their latter years were spent at Glover's country house, 'Little Windovers', in the village of Balsall Common, near Coventry, where Glover's eldest sister, Ellen, lived with them until her death in 1954 aged 72. Glover himself died aged 85 in 1983, leaving Ralph Hall as his sole heir. Hall died four years later after suffering a gradual decline in health.

In his later years Glover was described by friends in Balsall Common as "charming, if somewhat reserved", and Ralph as an "outgoing, cheerful Cockney"

'Little Windovers' and Glover's possessions were put up for auction in 1988 by Hall's next of kin. One lot was a cardboard box that contained much of Glover's collection of negatives from photographs he had taken since serving in the trenches in the First World War, as well as journals, and letters and correspondence from his many lovers during the decades, including letters from Hall written during his air service in the Second World War. Much of the collection was published in a book in 1992 with text by James Gardiner, A Class Apart - The Private Pictures of Montague Glover, and is a great insight into the underworld of gay British society in the early 20th century.

Themes

"Rough trade"
Glover's photographs tend to document 'rough trade', the working class male prostitutes of the period, making distinctive note of the divisions of social class as depicted by dress. Many of his photographs also depict members of the military.

References

External links
Excerpt from 'A Class Apart' from walnet.org
'A Class Apart' at Amazon.co.uk

English LGBT photographers
English gay artists
Gay photographers
LGBT history in the United Kingdom
Artists' Rifles soldiers
1983 deaths
1898 births
British Army personnel of World War I
20th-century English LGBT people